PTSD Symptom Scale – Self-Report Version (PSS-SR) is a 17-item self-reported questionnaire to assess symptoms of posttraumatic stress disorder. Each of the 17 items describe PTSD symptoms which respondents rate in terms of their frequency or severity using a Likert-type scale ranging from 0 (not at all or only one time) to 3 (almost always or five or more times per week). Ratings on items are summed to create three subscales – re-experiencing, avoidance coping, and psychological hyperarousal (such as "jumpiness") – as well as a total score (that ranges from 0 to 51). All items of the PSS-SR should be answered, and assessment is done by total score. The total score higher than 13 indicates on likelihood of PTSD.

See also 
 Child PTSD Symptom Scale
 Diagnostic classification and rating scales used in psychiatry

References

Further reading 
 

Mental disorders screening and assessment tools
Post-traumatic stress disorder